Four Sail is the fourth studio album by the American rock band, Love, released in 1969.

Background
By mid-1968, Arthur Lee was the only remaining member of the Forever Changes line-up of Love. Three LPs worth of material were recorded in a makeshift studio in a Los Angeles warehouse, with Elektra Records given the rights to first choice of tracks to fulfill Lee's contractual obligation, and the remainder released as the Blue Thumb LP Out Here. The album features a significant amount of vocal double-tracking by Lee.

"Always See Your Face" was featured in the 2000 film High Fidelity and was included on the official soundtrack. The song was also featured on the soundtrack of Lady Bird (2017).

Reception

In 2014, Four Sail was ranked number 1 on NME's list of 101 Albums To Hear Before You Die. In 2019, Bob Stanley wrote in Record Collector that "[t]here was a time when people dismissed Love’s very fine 1969 album Four Sail simply because it didn’t sound like the sequel to Forever Changes," but noted the album had been "reclaimed" in later times.

Track listing

Personnel
According to the 2002 CD booklet.

 Arthur Lee – lead vocal, piano, harmonica, rhythm guitar, congas
 Jay Donnellan – lead guitar
 Frank Fayad – bass, background vocals on "Dream" and "Robert Montgomery"
 George Suranovich – drums except on "Good Times" and "I'm With You", background vocals on "Dream" and "Robert Montgomery"
 Drachen Theaker – drums on "Good Times" and "I'm With You"

References

1969 albums
Love (band) albums
Elektra Records albums
Psychedelic rock albums by American artists
Albums produced by Arthur Lee (musician)